Ragnarök is a series of events in Norse mythology resulting in the fiery destruction and fertile rebirth of the world.

Ragnarok can also refer to:

Arts and entertainment

Anime, manga, and light novels
 Ragnarok (manhwa), a  series upon which the MMORPG, Ragnarok Online, is based
 Ragnarok the Animation, an anime series based upon the MMORPG, Ragnarok Online
 Sword of the Dark Ones, known as Ragnarok in Japan, a manga series based on a series of Japanese fantasy novels
Record of Ragnarok, a Japanese manga series

Books and short stories
 "Ragnarok", a short story written by Argentine writer Jorge Luis Borges
 Ragnarok: The Age of Fire and Gravel, a book by Ignatius L. Donnelly
 Ragnarok: The End of the Gods, novel by A. S. Byatt
 Voyager: Ragnarok, a Star Trek: Voyager novel by Nathan Archer

Film and television
 , or simply Ragnarok, a 2013 Norwegian film about the legendary story of Ragnarok
 John Hodgman: Ragnarok, a 2013 American comedy special starring John Hodgman
 Thor: Ragnarok, a 2017 American film featuring the Marvel Comics superhero Thor
 Ragnarok (TV series), a Netflix series first released in 2020

Games
 Ragnarok (video game), a rogue-like video game
 Ragnarok (board game), a fantasy wargame published by SPI in a 1981 issue (#8) of  Ares
 Ragnarok Online, a MMORPG
 Ragnarok Online 2: Legend of the Second, a MMORPG, sequel to Ragnarok Online
 Rag'Narok, a large-scale tabletop wargame based on the skirmish game Confrontation
 Fate of the Norns: Ragnarok, a table-top RPG set during the Viking Age
 God of War Ragnarök, an action-adventure video game in the God of War series

Music
 Ragnarok (Norwegian band), a black metal band from Norway
 Ragnarök (Swedish band), a progressive rock band, also their self-titled first album
 Ragnarök (Gwar album), an album by the band Gwar
 Ragnarok (Týr album), a concept album by the band Týr
 , an album by the band Wardruna
 "Ragnarok", a song from Periphery's album Periphery II: This Time It's Personal

Fictional characters and elements
 Ragnarök (comics), a clone of Thor in the Marvel Comics continuity
 Ragnarok (Soul Eater character), a fictional character in the manga and anime series Soul Eater
 Ragnarök, a creator-owned depiction of Thor by Walt Simonson
 Project Ragna Rok, a Nazi plan to win World War II in the Hellboy comics

Events
 Ragnarok (gaming event), an annual week-long gaming event held by the Dagorhir Battle Games Association
 Ragnarök Festival, a pagan metal festival in Germany

Other uses
 Ragnarök, the HTML parser in newer versions of the Opera web browser
 Ragnarok, a professional wrestling maneuver used by the 
 Ragnarok, a satellite cannon in the video game Mega Man Zero 4